Twilight Dementia is the first live album by English power metal band DragonForce, released in Japan on 8 September 2010, the United Kingdom on 13 September and in the United States on September 14. The album was recorded in November and December 2009 during the United Kingdom leg of the Ultra Beatdown world tour, across nineteen different shows. The album features songs from all the band's previous albums. It is the last overall release to feature ZP Theart as the lead vocalist.

Track listing

Disc One

Disc Two

Personnel
ZP Theart – lead vocals
Herman Li – guitars, backing vocals
Sam Totman – guitars, backing vocals
Vadim Pruzhanov – keyboards, piano, theremin, Kaoss Pad, backing vocals
Dave Mackintosh – drums, backing vocals
Frédéric Leclercq – bass, backing vocals

Production
Produced By Karl Groom, Herman Li & Sam Totman

References

2010 live albums
DragonForce albums
Spinefarm Records live albums
Roadrunner Records live albums